Los Punsetes is a band currently residing in Madrid, Spain.

The band includes indie, pop, and rock sounds, and is composed of one woman and five men. They have been featured on the "Panamerika" Red Bull Music Academy radio episode 122. Their 2010 single "Tus amigos" has been a hit throughout Latin America.

Los Punsetes has a recording deal with Everlasting Records.

References

External links
Official Website
Artist Wiki Page
Los Punsetes Conquistan Nueva York
An article about their "Lp2 Remixes"

Spanish musical groups
Living people
Musical groups from Madrid
Year of birth missing (living people)